This is a list of islands of Thailand.

Thailand has hundreds of islands both in the Gulf of Thailand and in the Andaman Sea. The islands of the central Gulf of Thailand are mostly located near the coast. Formerly most of the islands in Thailand were uninhabited, but in recent times many have been developed for tourism.

Some of the island groups in Thailand come in clusters of numerous individual islands: Phang Nga Bay has 67, the Mu Ko Chang National Park has 52, Tarutao National Marine Park has 51, and Mu Ko Ang Thong National Park has 42.

Notes:
 In Thai, the names of islands are usually preceded with the word ko (Thai เกาะ), the Thai word for island. This word is often alternately romanized as koh, go or goh.  English language references to the names of the Thai islands should not have an additional "island" added to their names, or else the ko should be left off.  For example, "Ko Phi Phi Island" would be redundant, since "Ko Phi Phi" already means "Phi Phi Island"
  Various maps commonly spell Thai names differently, using different transliterations.  For example, Ko Mak may be seen as Koh Mak, Koh Maak or even Koh Mark. This list gives precedence to the Royal Thai General System of Transcription favored by the Government of Thailand, for the English-based Thai transcription is now becoming obsolete.
To help in using search engines, the list also contains alternative names (used on some maps) either in the "Alternate spellings" column, or in parentheses.

List of larger Thai islands

Eastern seaboard islands

Islands in Chanthaburi and Trat Provinces

West coast islands (Gulf of Thailand)

Southern islands (Gulf of Thailand)

Southern islands (Andaman Coast)

Southern islands (Phang Nga Bay)

Far southern islands

Islands in rivers and lakes

Other Thai islands and island groups
Ko Kra
Ko Losin

See also 
 List of islands

Gallery

References

Hydrographic Service of the Royal Thai Navy, charts 001, 142 and 147.

Thailand

Lists of landforms of Thailand
Thailand.Islands